Adnan Alkateb (عدنان الكاتب; born in 1958 in Latakia), is a British journalist of Syrian origin. He currently resides in Dubai and is the editorial Manager of Hia Magazine.

Career
 1982-1994 - Editor in a number of Syrian newspapers. Later editorial manager of the Syrian newspaper "Al-Wehda" and reporter to a lot of famous Arab newspapers and Magazines.
 1994-2006 - Editor at the Arab Press House in London and editorial manager of Sayidati magazine.
 2006 – present day: Editorial manager of Hia Magazine

Interviews with Arab and international celebrities
Adnan Alkateb has conducted significant interviews with the Arab region's and the world's most renowned personalities, including:
 Monica Bellucci
 Julia Roberts
 Gisele Bundchen
 Blake Lively
 Jennifer Lopez
 Amy Adams
 Beyonce
 Emilia Clarke
 Lady Kitty Spencer
 Bella Hadid
 Emily Ratajkowski
 Several Emirati businesswomen and leading young Emirati women, including Mona Bin Kalli, Lamia Abdulaziz Khan, Samira Abdul Aziz, Amna Binhendi and Hind Abdul Hamied Seddiqi

References 
 Adnan AlKateb on writing Encyclopedia of Celebrities. AL-Quds Newspaper. Retrieved 22 November 2013.
 MBC.net Adnan AlKateb Arab Celebrity beats international Celebrities. Retrieved 9 July 2014.
 Adnan AlKateb Reveals Encyclopedia of Celebrities. Nawa3em Magazine. Retrieved 15 January 2014.
 Shining among the Stars: Celebrity interviewer and seasoned journalist Adnan Al Kateb ranked first in global electronic media. Al-Ahram. Retrieved 5 June 2022.

External links
 http://www.hiamag.com/tags/adnan-al-kateb
 http://www.alrakia.com/tag/عدنان-الكاتب
 https://english.ahram.org.eg/News/467442.aspx
 https://www.instagram.com/adnanalkateb/
 https://adnanalkateb.com

1959 births
Living people
Syrian emigrants to the United Kingdom
British magazine editors